Al-Mutawakkil II, (1416 – 27 September 1497) was the fifteenth Abbasid caliph of Cairo for the Mamluk Sultanate between 1479 and 1497. His father, Ya'qub, was son of Al-Mutawakkil I.

Life 

His name was Abdul Aziz ibn Ya`qub ibn Muhammad. Al-Mutawakkil II and his mother is called Haji Malik, the daughter of one of the soldiers. He was loved between the private and the public because of the excellence of literature, ethics and humility, and a screen for each one.

When his uncle became ill, and his illness was entrusted to him after the office, when he died on the sixteenth of Muharram of 884. In 885 the prince led a campaign to the Turkmen. He met with the Emir of the State (the White Shah), defeated the Mamluks, captured the Yishpak and was killed on the shore of the Euphrates River. Then the Sultan "Qaitbay" reconciled with the Emirate (the White Shah). He was succeeded by al-Mustamsik.

References

Bibliography

1416 births
1497 deaths
15th-century Abbasid caliphs
Cairo-era Abbasid caliphs